One True Love is a 2012 Philippine television drama romance series broadcast by GMA Network. Directed by Andoy Ranay, it stars Alden Richards and Louise delos Reyes. It premiered on June 11, 2012 on the network's Telebabad line up replacing My Beloved. The series concluded on October 5, 2012 with a total of 85 episodes. It was replaced by Coffee Prince in its timeslot.

The series is streaming online on YouTube.

Cast and characters

Lead cast
 Louise delos Reyes as Elize Samonte
 Alden Richards as Tisoy Bulaong

Supporting cast
 Jean Garcia as Ellen Balute-Sandoval
 Raymond Bagatsing as Carlos Samonte
 Agot Isidro as Leila Samonte
 Bembol Roco as Henry Sandoval
 Caridad Sanchez as Matilda Bulaong
 Carlene Aguilar as Candice Buenafe
 Benjie Paras as Douglas
 Tiya Pusit as Brittany
 Frencheska Farr as Violy Balute
 Wynwyn Marquez as Marla
 Lucho Ayala as Troy Sandoval

Guest cast
 Odette Khan as Sioneng Balute
 Ana Capri as Dyna
 Edelweiss Tuzons as young Elize Samonte
 Nathaniel Britt as young Tisoy Bulaong
 Rita Iringan as Mavic
 Ana Abad Santos as Vivi
 Paolo O'Hara as Teban
 Mayton Eugenio as Iza
 Jhoana Marie Tan as Aireen
 Ping Medina as Jun Manabat
 Nomer Limatog Jr. as Zeus Pajarillo
 Annicka Dolonius as Carla Cabrera
 Robin Da Roza as Johnny

Production
On May 18, 2012 at the end of the network's flagship national news broadcast, 24 Oras, the series was formally announced via a cinema plug. The said cinema plug, with the title "Pushing Drama Beyond Limits", contains the three new primetime shows of the network for the second quarter of the year, which are One True Love, Luna Blanca and Makapiling Kang Muli. The full trailer of the series was launched on June 8, 2012, three days before its premiere telecast.

Early production of the series started on May 29, 2012, with Suzette Doctolero working as the creator, and lead writer, executive producer Nieva Sabit, creative director Jun Lana, director Andoy Ranay and Lilybeth Rasonable headed as the overall in-charge of the production. The series films in part in Lipa, Batangas and Manila. It is set in a fictional docks and port terminal, where the shipping company of Carlos Samonte. On July 24, 2012, Alden Richards announced that the series was extended to seven weeks. It was originally slated to air for eight weeks.

Casting
Late April 2012, GMA Network announces that they will give Alden Richards and Louise delos Reyes their own drama series, as the network pushes the love team into full stardom. The Alden-Louise tandem started gaining popularity and huge fan base after their first ever project together, the drama-fantasy series, Alakdana, which was a hit. It followed by several hit series, such as, the popular teeny-bop series Tween Hearts and its movie version Tween Academy: Class of 2012, and the recently concluded primetime series My Beloved, a Dingdong Dantes-Marian Rivera starrer, which they played supporting characters. In one of his interviews, Richards said that he is overwhelmed with the network's support for the love team. He further stated:

On the other hand, Delos Reyes finds this drama series as a dream come true. She stated... "I'm fine with whatever project that is offered to me. I did horror last year, this time, I'm into drama. They told me they see depth in my acting. I cannot pass up projects that have been given to me, like One True Love because of its interesting characters and engaging plotline."

This television series also marks Agot Isidro's first plunge into GMA Drama after she transferred and inked two-year exclusive contract with the network. In one of her interviews, the actress stated that her decision to switched network rooted on her cravings to work in a different environment, work with some old folks again, and try something new and more challenging roles.

The production people also cast versatile actors, Jean Garcia and Raymond Bagatsing, both of them had recently completed Alice Bungisngis and Her Wonder Walis and The Good Daughter. Prior to this series, Garcia and Bagatsing paired in the so-called "dancerye" Time of My Life in 2011. In an interview, Garcia said that she is grateful in doing both damsel-in-distress and anti-hero roles for she is able to show her versatility as an actress.

Themes
One True Love consists of various themes, such as love, family, friendships, rivalries, betrayal, and vengeance and explores the reasons behind them. The creator and head writer, Suzette Doctolero explained that the series is a fresh and absorbing drama, more on about enduring power of love between two people from two different walks of life.

Music
The series' producer uses "Pangarap Ko ang Ibigin Ka" as the theme song. It was composed by Ogie Alcasid, re-arranged by Mon Faustino for the series, and performed by La Diva.

Reception

Critical response
Ricky L. Calderon of Cebu-based newspaper, The Freeman, stated that the series is getting good feedback in terms of the acting being dished out by the lead casts, especially Alden Richards. While Jerry Donato of The Philippine Star, finds One True Love as the melodramatic version of a Shakespearean tragedy and possesses the "charm" of the American filmLove Story. "It is not surprising why One True Love is doing well in the ratings' game. This can be attributed to Alden and Louise's chemistry as perennial onscreen partners", he added.

Ratings
According to AGB Nielsen Philippines' Mega Manila household television ratings, the pilot episode of One True Love earned a 24.6% rating. While the final episode scored a 28.2% rating. The series had its highest rating on October 4, 2012, with a 28.9% rating.

Accolades

References

External links
 
 

2012 Philippine television series debuts
2012 Philippine television series endings
Filipino-language television shows
GMA Network drama series
Philippine romance television series
Television shows set in the Philippines